Bruce Park Scenic Reserve is located near Hunterville in the Rangitikei District of the North Island of New Zealand.

The park is named after Robert Cunningham Bruce, who gifted the forest remnant to the public.

The remnant contains a variety of native flora including rimu, tōtara and kahikatea trees.

References

Rangitikei District
Protected areas of Manawatū-Whanganui
Nature reserves in New Zealand